Ahmad Mahdavi Damghani (‎; 5 September 1926 – 17 June 2022) was an Iranian scholar and university professor.

Biography
Born in Mashhad, Iran, on 5 September 1926, he held a Ph.D. in Persian Literature and a Ph.D. in Islamic Theology from Tehran University, where he was a professor at the School of Literature and at the School of Theology between 1962 and 1985. Beginning in 1987, he taught Islamic sciences, Islamic literature, advanced Arabic and Persian Sufi texts, and Islamic philosophy at Harvard University and the University of Pennsylvania. Mahdavi Damghani also taught at the Autonomous University of Madrid for three years.

Selected works
He is the author of over 300 articles in scholarly journals and of several books including:
 Kashf al-Haqa'iq (Unveiling the Truths)
 Al-Majdi (On the Genealogy of the Prophet Muhammad's Family)
 Nasmat al Sahar - A History of Arab Shi`a Poets, Three volumes 
 The Sources of Arabic Poems in the Kalilah wa Dimna
 The Garden of Light: An Anthology of Sana`i's Hadiqah
 Kashf al-Haqa'iq 2 (Return of the Kashf)
 The sources of Arabic Poems in “Marzban-Nameh”, 1970s
 “Haasele Owqat” (A collection of assays and articles -1007 pages), 2002–2003
 Tarjumaye Ashaar Arabiye “Saadi” beh Farsi (Translation of “Saadi’s” Arabic poems into Persian), 2004
 Tchahr Maqaleh dar bareh “Amir-al-mumenin Ali Aleyh-al-salam” (Four articles regarding “Amir-al-mumenin Ali Aleyh-al-salam”), 2004–2005
 Maqalati “Dar Hadithe Digaran” (Articles in memory of his professors, friends, and others), 2005
 Taswib Aghlate Tchapi Tafsir, “Kashf-al-asrar” (Correction of erratum in the printed book of “Tafsir Kashf-al-asrar”), 2007
 Dar babe “Khizr” (Regarding “Khizr“), 2007
 “The Noble Princess Shahrbanu” The mother of the Imam Ali b. al-Husain al-Sajjad” Mirror of heritage (Ayene-ye Miras), 2009
 “In the Memory of Companions and Rain Drops“, (Yadeh Yaran va Qatreh hayeh Baran) A collection of his various articles, 2011
 Yad-E-Azizan Dar Bargri-Zan (21 Articles Ettelaat Presse), 2015
 Divan Khazen (Distinguished poet 4th century Hegir Miras-E-Maktoub), 2015
 Essays in Islamic Philology, History and Philosophy, 2016

References

1926 births
2022 deaths
People from Mashhad
Academic staff of the University of Tehran
American Islamic studies scholars
University of Tehran alumni
Harvard University faculty
University of Pennsylvania faculty
Faculty of Theology and Islamic Studies of the University of Tehran alumni
Faculty of Letters and Humanities of the University of Tehran alumni
Burials at Imam Reza Shrine
Muslim scholars of Islamic studies